The 1952 Utah gubernatorial election was held on November 4, 1952. Incumbent Republican J. Bracken Lee defeated Democratic nominee Earl J. Glade with 55.09% of the vote.

General election

Candidates
J. Bracken Lee, Republican 
Earl J. Glade, Democratic

Results

References

1952
Utah
Gubernatorial